The Croatian–Hungarian Settlement was a pact signed in 1868 that governed Croatia's political status in the Hungarian-ruled part of Austria-Hungary. It lasted until the end of World War I, when the Croatian Parliament, as the representative of the historical sovereignty of Croatia, decided on October 29, 1918 to end all state and legal ties with the old Austria-Hungary.

Background

Before the Revolutions of 1848 in the Habsburg areas and the notable actions of Croatian Ban Josip Jelačić, the northern Croatian lands were divided into the Kingdom of Croatia and the Kingdom of Slavonia as separate Habsburg crown lands, recognized as Lands of the Crown of St. Stephen and under the jurisdiction of the Kingdom of Hungary but effectively functioned a single kingdom, subordinate to the central government in Vienna. After 1849, Slavonia and Croatia continued to function in the same capacity. Imperial officials referred to this kingdom simply as the Kingdom of Croatia-Slavonia.

The southern Croatian land, the Kingdom of Dalmatia, was formed from the southern parts of the Illyrian Provinces that the Habsburg monarchy conquered from the French Empire in 1815 and it remained a separate administrative division of the Austrian part of the monarchy.

When the Austro-Hungarian Compromise of 1867 created the Austro-Hungarian Dual Monarchy, the Habsburg crownlands of Croatia and Slavonia were effectively merged and placed under Hungarian jurisdiction. Levin Rauch became the acting ban of Croatia, replacing Josip Šokčević.

Ban Rauch prepared a new electoral law that was imposed by the king on October 20, 1867; it reduced the number of elected representatives to 66 and increased the number of unelected ones (the so-called virilist members).
In the election held from November 19 to December 23, 1867, the People's Party won only 14 seats, and Rauch's Unionist Party obtained a majority in the Sabor.
Although many Croats who sought full autonomy for the South Slavs of the empire objected to that arrangement, that questionable session of Sabor confirmed the subordination of Croatia to Hungary by accepting the Nagodba on 24 September 1868.

Description

An agreement was reached between the Parliament of Hungary on the one hand and the Parliament of Croatia on the other hand, with regard to composing by a joint enactment the constitutional questions at issue between them. After the settlement was confirmed, enforced and sanctioned by His Imperial and Apostolic Royal Majesty, it was thereby incorporated as a joint fundamental law of Hungary and of Croatia, Slavonia and Dalmatia.

With this compromise the Croatian Parliament elected twenty-nine (forty after reincorporation of Croatian Military Frontier and Slavonian Military Frontier in 1881) deputies to the House of Representatives and two members (three after 1881) to the House of Magnates of the Diet of Hungary, which controlled the military, the financial system, legislation and administration, Sea Law, Commercial Law, the law of Bills of Exchange and Mining Law, and generally matters of commerce, customs, telegraphs, Post Office, railways, harbors, shipping, and those roads and rivers which jointly concern Hungary and Croatia-Slavonia.

Following the Settlement, the Croatian kingdom was referred to using the name Kingdom of Croatia-Slavonia. Article 66 of the settlement specified lands of the Kingdom of Croatia-Slavonia, including Dalmatia in the list, even though Dalmatia remained part of Cisleithania until dissolution of Austria-Hungary. Practical territorial consequences of the settlement were creation of the city and port of Rijeka as Corpus separatum attached to the Kingdom of Hungary (pursuant to the article 66) and incorporation of the Croatian Military Frontier and the Slavonian Military Frontier in the Kingdom of Croatia-Slavonia (pursuant to articles 65 and 66) in 1881.

The manner by which Article 66 was handled left the issue of the port of Rijeka (Fiume) unresolved. Croatia saw it as part of its territory, but Hungary saw it as Corpus separatum.

See also

Kingdom of Croatia-Slavonia
Timeline of Croatian history

References

External links
HRVATSKO-UGARSKA NAGODBA (1868)
 Tekst Hrvatsko-ugarske nagodbe iz 1868. Österreichische Nationalbibliothek Text in Croatian
 1868. évi XXX. törvénycikk, 1000ev.hu Text in Hungarian

1868 treaties
Treaties of the Kingdom of Croatia-Slavonia
Treaties of the Kingdom of Hungary (1000–1918)
Croatia–Hungary relations
1868 in Croatia
1868 in Hungary
1868 establishments in Austria-Hungary
Legal history of Croatia
1868 documents